The Joseph Lister Memorial is a memorial to Joseph Lister, 1st Baron Lister by the sculptor Thomas Brock, situated in Portland Place in Marylebone, London. The memorial is positioned in the centre of the road opposite numbers 71 to 81 and is Grade II listed. It is close to Lister's home at 12 Park Crescent.

The memorial was unveiled by Sir John Bland-Sutton, President of the Royal College of Surgeons, on 13 March 1924. The base of the monument is made of grey Aberdeen granite. On top of the base is a bronze bust of Joseph Lister. At the front are the figures of a woman and a boy: the boy is holding a garland of flowers; the woman is pointing to Lister with her right hand.

References

External links
 
 Bust: Joseph Lister bust at London Remembers
 Joseph Lister Statue – Portland Place, London, UK at Waymarking

1924 sculptures
Busts in the United Kingdom
Grade II listed statues in the City of Westminster
Monuments and memorials in London
Outdoor sculptures in London
Sculptures by Thomas Brock
Sculptures of men in the United Kingdom
Sculptures of women in the United Kingdom
Sculptures of children in the United Kingdom